Valderas is a town and a municipality located in the province of León, Castile and León, Spain. According to the 2004 census (INE), the municipality had a population of 2,049 inhabitants.

See also
 Kingdom of León

References

Municipalities in the Province of León